Thomas A. Clare is an American lawyer who specializes in defamation law.

Career 
Clare is married to fellow lawyer Libby Locke and together they run the law firm Clare Locke LLP. They founded Clare Locke in 2014 after leaving Kirkland & Ellis LLP.

Clare represented Dominion Voting Systems against Rudy Giuliani, Sidney Powell and Mike Lindell in defamation cases related to the 2020 United States presidential election.

In January 2021 Clare was retained by Adam Neumann to defend his reputation. In 2022 he got HBO to change their characterization of the show Generation Hustle which featured an episode on Neumann and WeWork as being about scammers and true crime.

For about eighteen months beginning in the summer of 2019 he sent letters to journalist Patrick Radden Keefe, the New Yorker and Doubleday attempting to undermine the publication of Empire of Pain.

Personal life 
Clare's father was an aerospace engineer who worked for the navy and his mother was a housewife.

Clare identifies politically as an American conservative.

References 

American lawyers
Living people
Year of birth missing (living people)